Ara is a village in the Haifa District in northern Israel, located in the Wadi Ara valley. Since 1985, 'Ara has been part of the Ar'ara local council. It is located north of highway 65, between Ar'ara and Kfar Qara. Its population of 4,600 (as of 2004) is almost entirely Muslim.

History 
Burial caves along with white mosaic pavements have been excavated at the village.

Pottery remains from the Middle Bronze IIb and forward have been found here.

Some of the burial caves have been dated to the Middle and Late Bronze Ages and the Roman era. Byzantine lamps, glass vases and ceramics have also been found.

A building from the Umayyad era have been excavated in the village. It included many pottery objects and a glass jar, all from the same period.

Ottoman era 
'Ara, like the rest of Palestine, was incorporated into the Ottoman Empire in 1517, and in the census of 1596, the village appeared in the tax registers as being in the Nahiya of Shara of the Liwa of Lajjun. It had a population of 2 Muslim households and paid a fixed tax rate of 25% on wheat, barley, vines, and goats or beehives; a total of 1,800 akçe.

In 1882, PEF's  Survey of Western Palestine  noted "traces of ruins on a prominent mound with a well."

British Mandate era 
In the 1922 census of Palestine conducted by the British Mandate authorities, 'Arah had a population 372, all Muslims

This had increased at the time of the 1931 census to 673 Muslims, in 115 occupied houses.

In the 1945 statistics, 'Ara was counted with Ar'ara, together they had a population of 2,290 Muslims, of which 800 were in 'Ara.

Israel 
'Ara was merged with the neighboring Ar'ara in 1985.

References

Bibliography

External links
Welcome To 'Ara
Survey of Western Palestine, Map 8: IAA, Wikimedia commons

Haifa District
Arab villages in Israel
Populated places in Haifa District
Wadi Ara